Oakmont is a borough in Allegheny County, in the U.S. state of Pennsylvania. It is a Pittsburgh suburb and part of the Pittsburgh Metro Area.  The population was 6,758 as of the 2020 Census.

The settlement took its name from a landmark tree, as the deed description reads, "Beginning at a black oak on the bank of the Allegheny River ..." The borough is best known for the nearby Oakmont Country Club, a premier golf course which has been the site of numerous U.S. Open golf tournaments, including the 2016 U.S. Open.

Geography
Oakmont is located at  (40.519518, -79.837620).

The business district of town is on relatively flat land near the Allegheny River, but the main residential area is on the upward slope headed toward Oakmont Country Club and the Pennsylvania Turnpike.
Plum Creek flows through the borough.

Oakmont has three land borders, including Plum to the east, and Penn Hills and Verona to the south. Across the Allegheny River to the west and northwest, Oakmont runs adjacent with O'Hara Township to the west and Harmar Township to the north (via the Hulton Bridge).

Education
Oakmont is served by the Riverview School District, which includes two elementary/junior high schools that extend through 6th grade and Riverview High School, which serves Oakmont and portions of neighboring Verona for grades 7–12. Riverview High School was ranked the No. 1 Single A School in Pennsylvania and in the top 100 overall in the state, including 18th in the Pittsburgh metro area, by U.S. News & World Report in 2020 and the 2020-21 Pittsburgh Business Times High School Rankings.

Notable highlights include a 10:1 student:teacher ratio, consistently leading state/national trends on SAT, ACT, and AP performance, and 83% of students continuing education post-graduation.

Demographics

As of the census of 2000, there were 6,911 people, 3,118 households, and 1,708 families residing in the borough. The population density was 4,250.0 people per square mile (1,637.0/km2). There were 3,269 housing units at an average density of 2,010.3 per square mile (774.3/km2). The racial makeup of the borough was 97.84% White, 0.90% African American, 0.10% Native American, 0.49% Asian, 0.17% from other races, and 0.49% from two or more races. Hispanic or Latino of any race were 0.62% of the population.

There were 3,118 households, out of which 21.7% had children under the age of 18 living with them, 43.3% were married couples living together, 9.0% had a female householder with no husband present, and 45.2% were non-families. 39.7% of all households were made up of individuals, and 18.1% had someone living alone who was 65 years of age or older. The average household size was 2.08 and the average family size was 2.84.

In the borough the population was spread out, with 19.3% under the age of 18, 4.5% from 18 to 24, 26.6% from 25 to 44, 24.2% from 45 to 64, and 25.4% who were 65 years of age or older. The median age was 45 years. For every 100 females, there were 79.2 males. For every 100 females age 18 and over, there were 74.0 males.

The median income for a household in the borough was $41,957, and the median income for a family was $57,821. Males had a median income of $42,152 versus $32,721 for females. The per capita income for the borough was $26,716. About 4.3% of families and 5.9% of the population were below the poverty line, including 7.5% of those under age 18 and 6.2% of those age 65 or over.

Government and Politics

Oakmont has commonly voted for the Republican Party, with the exception of 2016.

Points of interest
The Oakmont Country Club is located just outside the borough limits in the neighboring borough of Plum. The course has been consistently ranked in the top five courses of the world. It has hosted nine U.S. Opens, the most of any golf course, in 1927, 1935, 1953, 1962, 1973, 1983, 1994, 2007 and 2016, and is scheduled to host a tenth in 2025. It has also hosted three PGA Championships, five U.S. Amateurs, three NCAA Division I Men's Golf Championships, and two U.S. Women's Opens.
Oakmont Bakery, winner of Modern Baking magazine "Retail Bakery of the Year 2013," is located on Allegheny Avenue.
The Kerr Memorial Museum, located at 402 Delaware Avenue, was originally a family home built in 1898 for the Kerr family and is now a museum which is open for tours. The Kerr Museum brings to life the story of the middle class in late nineteenth-century America, often overshadowed by that period's extremes of fabulous wealth and grinding poverty.

The Carnegie Library of Oakmont was built in 1899. It was the tenth library commissioned by Andrew Carnegie in America. The library is free and open to the public. An addition was added on between 2003 and 2005.
The Oaks Theater, located at 310 Allegheny Boulevard, first opened its doors on November 18, 1938, to a grand parade hosted by the boroughs of Oakmont and its "twin" borough of Verona. At the time, it was called “The Jewel of Oakmont” and featured indoor air conditioning which was a real treat for the time. In 2015 it was converted from a single-screen Art Deco-style theater to a modern, multi-purpose entertainment venue. The renovation maintained the original architectural style and grandeur of the theater, while adding modern amenities such as cabaret seating, a full-service bar, and updated lighting and sound capabilities. The theater hosts both local and national live music acts, as well as comedy performances, plays and movies.
The Oakmont Verona Cemetery is located on Pennsylvania Avenue in Oakmont.
The Jonathon Hulton Bridge was constructed in 1908. Spanning the Allegheny River,  it connects Oakmont and Harmarville. The bridge was demolished successfully with explosives at 9:49 AM on Tuesday, January 26, 2016, to make way for the opening of a new bridge. The entire project, including implosion of the original bridge, was completed in the Spring of 2016, in time for the 2016 U.S. Open at nearby Oakmont Country Club.
Riverside Park, located along the Allegheny River, possesses tennis courts, basketball court, running track, pavilions, and a children's playground.
Oakmont History Center & Museum, is located at 628 Allegheny River Boulevard.

Development

Hazardous Waste Cleanup: Edgewater Steel Company in Oakmont, Pennsylvania

EPA Site Identification 
EPA ID: PAD074966789

Property Area:  2.3 Acres

Other Names: Regional Industrial Development Corp (RIDC)

Cleanup Status:  Corrective  Action Underway

Human Exposures under Control:  Yes, Controlled

Groundwater under Control: Yes, Controlled

Last Update:  6/4/2011

Cleanup Status 
This facility is one of EPA Region III's high priority Resource Conservation and Recovery Act (RCRA) corrective action sites. Edgewater Steel Company clean closed an EAF dust waste pile in 1991 and closed in place a construction/demolition waste landfill in 1995. The facility shut down operations in 2001. In October, 2001 an environmental inspection was done. An Environmental Indicator (EI) report was prepared in March 2002. Pennsylvania Department of Environmental Protection (PADEP) determined that with the removal of waste from the manufacturing buildings, the EI's would be under control (Sept. 2003). The buildings were demolished in 2005, but some waste (dust) was apparently disposed on site during demolition activities. Subsequent sampling in 2006 did not locate any dust or materials that exhibited a hazardous waste characteristic. Additionally as part of a Pennsylvania Department of Environmental Protection (PADEP) Act 2 site characterization, limited TCE impacts to groundwater were found.

The site was divided into two parcels for remediation and redevelopment as residential, commercial and light industrial properties; the 32-acre Oakmont area and the 28 acre River Edge area. The Oakmont area remediation and redevelopment plan received PADEP Act 2 approval, and redevelopment is underway. The River Edge area is currently under remediation.

Contaminants at this Facility 
PADEP allowed the Edgewater Steel Corporation to cease groundwater monitoring activities for the former EAF dust landfill because (1) it could not be properly monitored due to hydraulic influences from nearby Plum Creek and (2) Edgewater removed the EAF dust and contaminated soil, thus clean closing the unit. Earth Sciences Consultants, on behalf of Edgewater, closed monitoring wells MW-903 through MW-906. Therefore, this area posed no further groundwater contamination potential. Fay Construction currently owns the property where this unit was located.

The plant has a “large asbestos situation” in the old stream boilers, and possibly asbestos contaminated furnaces, ceiling tiles, and floor tiles, none of which are Solid Waste Management Units (SWMUs). Operations have ceased at the site due to bankruptcy; hence there are currently no workers at the site. The plant is undergoing selective demolition, so any asbestos concerns will be addressed as part of any demolition work.

New Construction At Former Edgewater Steel Site 
At the site where Edgewater Steel once stood, a new greener residential neighborhood is rising. The new residential area of Oakmont will acquire condominiums, town homes, manor flats, cottage homes, village homes, green spaces, a waterfront park, and more. Edgewater will obtain 242 homes ranging from $200,000 to $700,000. These new homes will reduce energy uses by 30%. Home construction began in July 2011, with 26 home lots already sold. In addition to the residential area Edgewater will have its own commercial district.

Notable person
Reb Beach, American rock guitarist for Winger and Whitesnake.

Gallery

See also
 List of crossings of the Allegheny River
 List of museums in Pennsylvania

References

Sources

Populated places established in 1889
Pittsburgh metropolitan area
Boroughs in Allegheny County, Pennsylvania
1889 establishments in Pennsylvania